John Linn was a British Royal Engineer. He was born in Corstorphine and joined the Army in 1846. Two years later he moved to Halifax, Nova Scotia where he was stationed for 9 years. He later settled in British Columbia in 1859. He died on 18 April 1876 from a paralytic stroke. North Vancouver's Lynn Valley is named after him.

References
The Royal Engineers Living History Group
District of North Vancouver's Lynn Canyon Park Guide
A Short History of the North Shore by Cherry Bouton
Namely Vancouver: A Hidden History of Vancouver Place Names (2001) By Tom Snyders, Jennifer O'Rourke, page 172.

Military personnel from Edinburgh
Royal Engineers soldiers
North Vancouver (district municipality)